Campanulotes is a genus of lice in the disputed, probably paraphyletic, family Philopteridae, the chewing lice, or in the family Goniodidae.

It is mostly a genus of parasites on birds.

Some species in the genus may have been cases of coextinction. The species Campanulotes defectus was thought to have been unique to the passenger pigeon (Ectopistes migratorius), an extinct bird from North America, but is now believed to have been a case of a contaminated specimen, as the species is considered to be the still-extant Campanulotes flavus of Australia.

Known species of ectoparasites of the common rock dove include Campanulotes bidentatus compar.

References 

 Pigeon lice down under: Taxonomy of Australian Campanulotes (Phthiraptera: Philopteridae), with a description of C. durdeni N. Sp. Roger D. Price, Dale H. Clayton, and Richard J. Adams, Journal of Parasitology: October 2000, Vol. 86, No. 5, pages 948-950

External links 

 
 

Lice
Insect genera